A nd game (or nk game) is a generalization of the game tic-tac-toe to higher dimensions. It is a game played on a nd hypercube with 2 players. If one player creates a line of length n of their symbol (X or O) they win the game. However, if all nd spaces are filled then the game is a draw. Tic-tac-toe is the game where n equals 3 and d equals 2 (3, 2). Qubic is the  game. The  or  games are trivially won by the first player as there is only one space ( and ).

There are a total of  winning lines in a nd game.

See also

References 

Tic-tac-toe